Mayland is an unincorporated community located in Rockingham County, in the U.S. state of Virginia. It is located southeast of Broadway, along Route 259. Mayland used to have its own post office, but now the post office has been moved to Broadway. Broadway is near Harrisonburg, Harrisonburg is in the Shenandoah Valley.

References

Unincorporated communities in Rockingham County, Virginia
Unincorporated communities in Virginia